Sulzer may refer to:

People
 Alain Claude Sulzer (born 1953), Swiss writer and translator
 Alexander Sulzer (born 1984), German ice hockey player
 Charles August Sulzer, delegate to the United States House of Representatives from the Territory of Alaska
 David Sulzer (born 1956), American neuroscientist
 Joe Sulzer, US politician
 Johann Sulzer (disambiguation)
 Julius Sulzer (1830–1891), Austrian composer and conductor, son of Salomon
 Salomon Sulzer (1804–1890), Austrian cantor, synagogal music composer
 Simon Sulzer (1508–1585) Swiss theologian
 William Sulzer (1863–1941), a Governor of New York

Places
 16505 Sulzer, a main-belt asteroid
 Conrad Sulzer Regional Library, Chicago
 Sulzer, Alaska, a former settlement on Prince of Wales Island, which serviced a nearby copper mine operated by Charles and William Sulzer

Businesses
 Sulzer (manufacturer), a Swiss industrial engineering and manufacturing business

See also
 Sulz (disambiguation)

German-language surnames